Palestinian citizens of Israel, also known as 48-Palestinians are Arab citizens of Israel that self-identify as Palestinian. According to Israel's Central Bureau of Statistics, the Arab population in 2019 was estimated at 1,890,000, representing 20.95% of the country's population. The majority of these identify themselves as Arab or Palestinian by nationality and Israeli by citizenship. Many Arabs have family ties to Palestinians in the West Bank and Gaza Strip as well as to Palestinian refugees in Jordan, Syria and Lebanon.

Identification as Palestinian

Historical
Between 1948 and 1967, very few Arab citizens of Israel identified openly as "Palestinian". An "Israeli-Arab" identity, the preferred phrase of the Israeli establishment and public, was predominant. Public expressions of Palestinian identity, such as displays of the Palestinian flag or the singing and reciting of nationalist songs or poetry were illegal. Ever since the Nakba, the Palestinians that have remained within Israel's 1948 borders have been colloquially known as "48 Arabs".(). With the end of military administrative rule in 1966 and following the 1967 war, national consciousness and its expression among Israel's Arab citizens spread. A majority then self-identified as Palestinian, preferring this descriptor to Israeli Arab in numerous surveys over the years.

Terminology
How to refer to the Arab citizenry of Israel is a highly politicized issue, and there are a number of self-identification labels used by members of this community. Generally speaking, supporters of Israel tend to use Israeli Arab or Arab Israeli to refer to this population without mentioning Palestine, while critics of Israel (or supporters of Palestinians) tend to use Palestinian or Palestinian Arab without referencing Israel. According to The New York Times, most preferred to identify themselves as Palestinian citizens of Israel rather than as Israeli Arabs, as of 2012. The New York Times uses both 'Palestinian Israelis' and 'Israeli Arabs' to refer to the same population.

Common practice in contemporary academic literature is to identify this community as Palestinian as it is how the majority self-identify. Terms preferred by most Arab citizens to identify themselves include Palestinians, Palestinians in Israel, Israeli Palestinians, the Palestinians of 1948, Palestinian Arabs, Palestinian Arab citizens of Israel or Palestinian citizens of Israel. There are, however, individuals from among the Arab citizenry who reject the term Palestinian altogether. A minority of Israel's Arab citizens include "Israeli" in some way in their self-identifying label; the majority identify as Palestinian by nationality and Israeli by citizenship.

The Israeli establishment prefers Israeli Arabs or Arabs in Israel, and also uses the terms the minorities, the Arab sector, Arabs of Israel and Arab citizens of Israel. These labels have been criticized for denying this population a political or national identification, obscuring their Palestinian identity and connection to Palestine. The term Israeli Arabs in particular is viewed as a construct of the Israeli authorities. It is nonetheless used by a significant minority of the Arab population, "reflecting its dominance in Israeli social discourse."

Other terms used to refer to this population include Palestinian Arabs in Israel, Israeli Palestinian Arabs, the Arabs inside the Green Line, and the Arabs within. The latter two appellations, among others listed above, are not applied to the East Jerusalem Arab population or the Druze in the Golan Heights, as these territories were occupied by Israel in 1967. As the Israel Central Bureau of Statistics defines the area covered in its statistics survey as including East Jerusalem and the Golan Heights, the number of Arabs in Israel is calculated as 20.95% of the Israeli population (2019).

Political
The question of Palestinian identity extends to representation in the Israeli Knesset. Journalist Ruth Margalit says of Mansour Abbas of the United Arab List, a member of the governing coalition, "The traditional term for this group, Arab Israelis, is increasingly controversial, but it’s the one that Abbas prefers." Abbas gave an interview to Israeli media in November 2021 and said  "My rights don’t just come from my citizenship. My rights also come from being a member of the Palestinian people, a son of this Palestinian homeland. And whether we like it or not, the State of Israel, with its identity, was established inside the Palestinian homeland," Sami Abu Shehadeh of Balad is "an outspoken advocate of Palestinian identity". He says, referring to the 2021 Israel–Palestine crisis, "... If the past weeks provided lessons for the international community, then a main one is that they cannot continue to ignore the Palestinian citizens of Israel. Any solution should include full equality for all citizens as well as the respect and recognition of our rights as a national minority."

Surveys 
In a 2017 telephone poll, 40% of Arab citizens of Israel identified as "Arab in Israel / Arab citizen of Israel", 15% identified as "Palestinian", 8.9% as "Palestinian in Israel / Palestinian citizen of Israel", and 8.7% as "Arab"; the focus groups associated with the poll provided a different outcome, in which "there was consensus that Palestinian identity occupies a central place in their consciousness".

According to a 2019 survey by University of Haifa professor Sammy Smooha, conducted in Arabic among 718 Arab adults, 47% of the Arab population chose Palestinian identities with an Israeli component ("Israeli Palestinian", "Palestinian in Israel", "Palestinian Arab in Israel"), 36% prefers Israeli Arab identities without a Palestinian component ("Israeli", "Arab", "Arab in Israel", "Israeli Arab"), and 15% chose Palestinian identities without an Israeli component ("Palestinian", "Palestinian Arab"). When these two components are presented as competitors, 69% chose exclusive or primary Palestinian identity, compared with 30% who chose exclusive or primary Israeli Arab identity. 66% of the Arab population agreed that "the identity of 'Palestinian Arab in Israel' is appropriate to most Arabs in Israel."

Israeli citizenship 

Between Israel's declaration of independence on 14 May 1948 and the Israeli Nationality Law of 14 July 1952, there technically were no Israeli citizens.

In the aftermath of the 1947–49 Palestine war, of the estimated 950,000 Arabs that lived in the territory that became Israel before the war, over 80% fled or were expelled and 20%, some 156,000, remained. Arab citizens of Israel today are largely composed of the people who remained and their descendants. Others include some from the Gaza Strip and the West Bank who procured Israeli citizenship under family-unification provisions made significantly more stringent in the aftermath of the Second Intifada.

While most Arabs remaining in Israel were granted citizenship, they were subject to martial law in the early years of the state. Zionism had given little serious thought as to how to integrate Arabs, and according to Ian Lustick subsequent policies were 'implemented by a rigorous regime of military rule that dominated what remained of the Arab population in territory ruled by Israel, enabling the state to expropriate most Arab-owned land, severely limit its access to investment capital and employment opportunity, and eliminate virtually all opportunities to use citizenship as a vehicle for gaining political influence'. Travel permits, curfews, administrative detentions, and expulsions were part of life until 1966.

Arabs who held Israeli citizenship were entitled to vote for the Israeli Knesset. Arab Knesset members have served in office since the First Knesset. The first Arab Knesset members were Amin-Salim Jarjora and Seif el-Din el-Zoubi who were members of the Democratic List of Nazareth party and Tawfik Toubi member of the Maki party.

In 1965 a radical independent Arab group called al-Ard forming the Arab Socialist List tried to run for Knesset elections. The list was banned by the Israeli Central Elections Committee.

In 1966, martial law was lifted completely, and the government set about dismantling most of the discriminatory laws, while Arab citizens were granted the same rights as Jewish citizens under law.

Population 

According to the Israel Central Bureau of Statistics, the Israeli population for 2020 was 9,293.3k, of which, 24.4% or 1957.6k (including residents of East Jerusalem) were Arabs.

Relations with Palestinians outside of Israel

In the occupied territories
During the 2021 Israel–Palestine crisis, according to Al Arabiya, Fatah backed a call for a general strike on 18 May 2021 in the West Bank, including East Jerusalem and Palestinians in Israel were asked to take part. In an unusual display of unity by "Palestinian citizens of Israel, who make up 20% of its population, and those in the territories Israel seized in 1967" the strike went ahead and "shops were shuttered across cities in Gaza, the occupied West Bank and in villages and towns inside Israel".

The 2003 Citizenship and Entry into Israel Law effectively bans citizenship or permanent residency for Palestinians from the occupied territories who marry Israelis. The law expired in 2021 and about 12,700 Palestinians married to Israeli Arab citizens are able to apply for citizenship but Israel has delayed all family reunification requests, maintaining the status quo.

In Arab host countries

Palestinian arts in Israel

Palestinian musicians have found success in a number of genres, from singer Amal Murkus (from Kafr Yasif) to the Palestinian hip hop group DAM (from Lod)> DAM in particular have spurred the emergence of other hip hop groups from Akka, to Bethlehem, to Ramallah, to Gaza City.

In the art scene, the Palestinian minority in Israel has asserted its identity according to Ben Zvi, who suggests that this group of artists who are identified "on the one hand, as part of a broad Palestinian cultural system, and on the other — in a differentiated manner — as the Palestinian minority in Israel."
The issue of identity becomes particularly clear in an artwork of the Palestinian artist Raafat Hattab from Jaffa. The video performance "untitled" was part of the exhibition "Men in the Sun" in the Herzliya Museum of Contemporary Art in 2009. In the work, Raafat Hattab is seen as he poures water into a bucket in order to lengthily water an olive tree which is a sign for the lost paradise before 1948. The scene is primed by the song Hob (Love) by the Lebanese Ahmad Kaabour which expresses the need for Palestinian solidarity. The chorus repeats the phrase "I left a place" and it seems as if the video is dealing with memory. But as the camera zooms out, the spectator realizes that Hattab and the olive tree both actually stand in the middle of the Rabin Square, a main place in Tel Aviv, and the water used for watering the tree comes from the nearby fountain. "In my installations I appear in different identities that combined are my identity — a Palestinian minority in Israel and a queer minority in the Palestinian culture", explains Rafaat Hattab in an interview with the Tel Avivian City Mouse Magazine. Asim Abu Shaqra's focus of the sabra plant (prickly pear cactus) in his paintings is another example of the centrality of identity, especially vis-a-vie the Palestinian subject's Israeli counterpart, in Palestinian art. Tal Ben Zvi writes that Abu Shaqra is one of the very few Palestinian artists, who have succeeded in entering the canon of Israeli art. Abu Shaqra painted various paintings featuring the sabra, both a symbol for the Palestinian Nakba and a symbol for the new Israeli and his work stirred up a debate in the Israeli art discourse over the image of the sabra in Israeli culture and over questions of cultural appropriation and ownership of this image.

Bibliography
 Sa’di, Ahmad H., Trends in Israeli Social Science Research on the National Identity of the Palestinian Citizens of Israel, Asian Journal of Social Science 32, no. 1 (2004): 140–60
 Muhammad Amara, Language, Identity and Conflict: Examining Collective Identity through the Labels of the Palestinians in Israel, Journal of Holy Land and Palestine Studies 15.2 (2016): 203–223 Edinburgh University Press, DOI: 10.3366/hlps.2016.0141

See also

Israeli Jews
Israelis
Lebanese in Israel

References

Notes

External links 
Mapping Palestinian politics, Palestinian citizens of Israel

Israeli people of Palestinian descent
Society of Israel